The following are the national records in athletics in Vanuatu maintained by the Vanuatu Athletics Federation.

Outdoor

Key to tables:

h = hand timing

Men

†: Result obtained during decathlon

Women

‡: French citizens

Indoor

Men

Women

References
General
World Athletics Statistic Handbook 2019: National Outdoor Records
World Athletics Statistic Handbook 2018: National Indoor Records
Specific

Vanuatuan
records
Athletics